Julie Leask or Julie-Anne Leask is an Australian social scientist and professor in the Susan Wakil School of Nursing and Midwifery, Faculty of Medicine and Health, University of Sydney. Leask is a leading researcher on social and behavioural aspects of vaccination and infectious disease prevention. Leask’s research focuses on vaccine uptake, communication, strengthening vaccination programs and policy.  Leask’s flagship project is Sharing Knowledge About Immunisation (SKAI) - a vaccination communication package designed to improve vaccination conversations between parents and health care workers. Additionally, Leask is advisor to the World Health Organization (WHO) on vaccine acceptance and demand issues and was the chair of the WHO Measuring Behavioural and Social Drivers of Vaccination working group (2018-2022).

Education  
Leask holds a Diploma in Health Science (Nursing) from the University of Technology Sydney (1990), a Certificate of Midwifery Theory and Practice from the Northern Sydney Area Midwifery School (1992), a Master of Public Health from the University of Sydney (1998) and a Doctor of Philosophy (PhD) also from the University of Sydney (2002). Leask’s PhD thesis was titled Understanding Immunisation Controversies.

Professional Academic Life 
After completing her PhD in 2002, Leask established the Social Science Unit at the National Centre for Immunisation Research and Surveillance. In 2012, Leask was appointed as an NHMRC Career Development Fellow at the School of Public Health, University of Sydney. In 2017, Leask moved to the Susan Wakil School of Nursing and Midwifery, Faculty of Medicine and Health, The University of Sydney, becoming Professor in 2018. Leask is also Adjunct Professor in the School of Public Health, Faculty of Medicine and Health, University of Sydney and is a Visiting Professorial Fellow, National Centre for Immunisation Research and Surveillance. She currently leads the Social and Behavioural Insights in Immunisation research group at the University of Sydney  - a team of postdoctoral researchers, research assistants and higher degree research students.

Research and Impact 
Leask’s research and impact extends over more than two decades. Leask’s research centres around: (1) identifying the causes of low vaccination with quality data; (2) synthesising and translating evidence for raising vaccination rates; (3) building capacity of researchers, practitioners and program managers in closing coverage gaps and improving program delivery; and (4) improving public communication in health emergencies.

Leask’s flagship project is Sharing Knowledge About Immunisation (SKAI) - a vaccination communication package designed to improve vaccination conversations between parents and health care workers. SKAI provides communication strategies, tailored resources, a website and training module. SKAI was implemented nationally in Australia through the National Centre for Immunisation Research and Surveillance.

Leask’s current focus is on global tools to diagnose and act on the causes of low vaccination. Her chairing role with WHO focused on quality measures of the reasons for under-vaccination of children and COVID-19 vaccination in adults and healthcare workers. These surveys and interview guides measure the Behavioural and Social Drivers of Vaccination (BeSD) within the domains of: (1) Thinking and feeling about vaccines; (2) Social processes that drive or inhibit vaccination; (3) Motivation (or hesitancy) to seek vaccination; and (4) Practical issues involved in seeking and receiving vaccination. These tools are now being used in multiple countries to determine barriers to routine immunisation during the pandemic.

International Expert Contributions 
Leask’s international expert contributions to vaccination include the World Health Organization (WHO), UNICEF, International Federation for the Red Cross and Red Crescent Societies, US Centre for Diseases Control and Prevention, and the US President’s Cancer Panel. Additionally, Leask holds international advisory roles with the WHO working group for measuring the Behavioural and Social Drivers of Vaccination (Chair 2018-2022); the WHO Immunization and Vaccines related Implementation Research advisory committee; the WHO South East Asia Region Immunisation Technical Advisory Group; and was the lead guidance writer for the COVID-19 vaccine safety communication manual for the WHO Global Advisory Committee of Vaccine Safety. Additionally, Leask was co-author on a commissioned review paper on the Psychology of Vaccination for Psychological Sciences in the Public Interest.

Awards and honours 
 President’s Award, Public Health Association of Australia – group award for the Collaboration on Social Science and Immunisation, 2022
 Supervisor of the Year (Medicine), Sydney University Postgraduate Representative Association, 2021
 Vice-Chancellor’s Award for Outstanding Contribution to the University Community, University of Sydney, 2021
 Overall  winner of the Australian Financial Review's 100 Women of Influence awards in     recognition of her work in improving vaccination rates both in Australia as well as on a global level, 2019
 Vice-chancellor’s Award for Excellence -Outstanding Research Engagement and Innovation, for Sharing Knowledge About Immunisation, 2019 http://www.talkingaboutimmunisation.org.au/
 Winner, Art in Science Competition, Westmead Research Hub, video category, 2018
 Public Health Impact Award, PHAA NSW, 2015 
 Sax Institute Research Action Award, 2015 (inaugural)
 National Health and Medical Research Council Career Development Fellowship, 2013-2017
 Teaching Award: Excellence in Postgraduate Supervision. Discipline of Paediatrics and Child Health, University of Sydney, 2011

References

Further reading 
 

Australian social scientists
Australian women academics
Year of birth missing (living people)
Living people
University of Technology Sydney alumni
University of Sydney alumni
Academic staff of the University of Sydney